The Spaulding Rehabilitation Hospital Cape Cod (SRHCC) is a rehabilitation hospital located in Sandwich, Massachusetts that serves both Cape Cod and the Islands. It was founded in 1995 and is part of the Spaulding Rehabilitation Network.

It was previously known as the Rehabilitation Hospital of the Cape and Islands (RHCI), and still operates under that name. The hospital is owned by Partners HealthCare, a non-profit organization that owns several hospitals in Massachusetts.

References

External links

Buildings and structures in Sandwich, Massachusetts
Hospitals in Barnstable County, Massachusetts